André Iuncker (29 July 1933 – 23 April 2020) was a French boxer. He competed in the men's featherweight event at the 1960 Summer Olympics.

References

1933 births
2020 deaths
French male boxers
Olympic boxers of France
Boxers at the 1960 Summer Olympics
Sportspeople from Meurthe-et-Moselle
Mediterranean Games medalists in boxing
Featherweight boxers
Mediterranean Games gold medalists for France
Mediterranean Games bronze medalists for France
Competitors at the 1959 Mediterranean Games